Track Record is a third compilation album by Australian band, Sherbet. It was released in August 1979.

Track listing

Chart positions

Personnel  
 Bass, vocals – Tony Mitchell
 Drums – Alan Sandow
 Guitar, vocals – Harvey James
 Keyboards, vocals – Garth Porter
 Lead vocals – Daryl Braithwaite

Release history

References 

Sherbet (band) compilation albums
1979 compilation albums
Festival Records compilation albums
Albums produced by Garth Porter
Albums produced by Richard Lush